William Murray Borthwick Laycock (26 October 1896 – 12 May 1966) was a rugby union player who represented Australia.

Laycock, a flanker, was born in New South Wales and claimed a total of 4 international rugby caps for Australia.

References

Australian rugby union players
Australia international rugby union players
1896 births
Rugby union flankers

1966 deaths
Rugby union players from New South Wales